PDA may refer to:

Science and technology 
 Patron-driven acquisition, a mechanism for libraries to purchase books
Personal digital assistant, a mobile device
 Photodiode array, a type of detector
 Polydiacetylenes, a family of conducting polymers
 Pitch detection algorithm, to find the pitch of a signal
 Pushdown automaton, a type of abstract device in automata theory

Biology and medicine 
 Pancreatic ductal adenocarcinoma, the main type of pancreatic cancer
 Patent ductus arteriosus, a heart defect
 Posterior descending artery, an artery
 Potato dextrose agar, a microbiological media for culturing yeast and fungus
 Pathological demand avoidance

Music
 "PDA" (song), a song by Interpol
 "PDA", a song by the Backstreet Boys from This Is Us
 "PDA", a song by Audio Adrenaline from Audio Adrenaline
 "P.D.A. (We Just Don't Care)", a song by John Legend
"PDA", a song by Emily Burns

Organizations
 Parenteral Drug Association, a global pharmaceutical trade association 
 Pharmacists' Defence Association, UK
 Peruvian Debate Association, for inter-school debating
 Pinoy Dream Academy, the Philippine franchise of Endemol's Star Academy
 Population and Community Development Association, Thailand
 Private defense agency, an enterprise which would provide personal protection and military defense services to individuals
 Professional Driver Association, of NASCAR drivers before the 1969 Talladega 500
 Public development authority, government-owned corporations in Washington, US

Politics
 Alternative Democratic Pole, a political party in Colombia (Polo Democrático Alternativo)
 Progressive Democratic Alliance, a former political party in British Columbia, Canada
 Progressive Democrats of America, a progressive political organization
 Party of Democratic Action, a Bosniak party in Bosnia-Herzegovina
Movement of Democratic Action, a political party in Bosnia-Herzegovina (Pokret demokratske akcije)
 Aruban Democratic Party, an Aruban political party (Partido Democrático Arubano)

Law and culture
 Public display of affection, an act of physical intimacy in the view of others
 Pregnancy Discrimination Act, US
 "PDA" (The Office), an episode from the American television sitcom The Office
 Past Doctor Adventures, spin-off novels from the BBC's Doctor Who
 Pub Design Awards, UK
 Professional Development Award, offered by the Scottish Qualification Authority
 Pathological Demand Avoidance